The 5th Modena Grand Prix was a motor race, run to Formula One rules, held on 22 September 1957 at Autodromo di Modena, Modena, Italy. The race was run over two 40 lap heats of the circuit, taking the aggregate of the results, and was won by French driver Jean Behra in a Maserati 250F.

This race, and the 1961 race, were the only two Modena Grands Prix run under Formula One rules.

Results

References 

Modena Grand Prix
Modena Grand Prix
Modena Grand Prix